Events in the year 2023 in Brunei.

Incumbents

Events 
Ongoing – COVID-19 pandemic in Brunei

 25 JanuaryPrincess Azemah marries Prince Bahar ibni Jefri Bolkiah.

References 

 

 
2020s in Brunei
Years of the 21st century in Brunei
Brunei
Brunei